Rebun Airport  was a public aerodrome located at Rebun in the Hokkaido, Japan. It opened in June 1978 and closed on April 9, 2009. The airport planned to be expanded from 1,000 meters to 2,000 meters from 2016. A new terminal building is also being constructed to handle jet service and open flights to Tokyo and Sapporo.

References

Airports in Hokkaido